Ednaston Manor is a country house in Ednaston, near Brailsford, Derbyshire, England. It was built in 1912–19 in a Queen Anne style by Edwin Lutyens, for William G. Player. It is a Grade I listed building.

It was bought by free newspaper pioneer and former Derby County chairman Lionel Pickering in 1979. He improved the extensive gardens, which were open to the public during the summer, then sold the house to a local businessman shortly before his death in 2006.

References

Country houses in Derbyshire
Grade I listed buildings in Derbyshire
Grade I listed houses
Houses completed in 1919
Works of Edwin Lutyens in England